Kanawha may refer to:

Places
 Kanawha River in West Virginia, joining the Ohio River at Point Pleasant
 Kanawha Falls, a waterfall on the Kanawha River
 Kanawha Falls, West Virginia, an unincorporated community in Fayette County near the waterfall
 Kanawha River Valley AVA, West Virginia wine region
 Little Kanawha River in West Virginia, joining the Ohio River at Parkersburg
 Kanawha, West Virginia, an unincorporated community in Wood County near Parkersburg
 Kanawha County, West Virginia
 Kanawha County textbook controversy, a violent school control struggle beginning in 1974
 State of Kanawha, an early name for the state of West Virginia
 Kanawha Canal, part of the James River and Kanawha Canal, a partially built canal in Richmond, VA
 Kanawha (Luray, Virginia), a historic house
 Kanawha, Iowa, city

Railroad
 Kanawha, a type 2-8-4 railroad steam locomotive

Ships
 Kanawha (1899), a steam yacht owned by Henry H. Rogers
 USS Kanawha or USNS Kanawha has been the name of seven ships of the United States Navy
 USS Kanawha II (SP-130), a yacht which served in the United States Navy from 1917 to 1919 and was renamed USS Piqua (SP-130) in 1918.
 The United States Coast Guard Cutter Kanawha, a buoy tender in Pine Bluff, Arkansas

Other uses
 Kanawha, a solar deity in Seneca mythology
 Kanawha Valley people, an ancient indigenous people who lived in what is now West Virginia
 "Kanawha", a song by rock band Seam from the album The Pace Is Glacial